Events from the year 1742 in Scotland.

Incumbents 

 Secretary of State for Scotland: vacant until 16 February; then The Marquess of Tweeddale

Law officers 
 Lord Advocate – Charles Erskine, then Robert Craigie
 Solicitor General for Scotland – William Grant of Prestongrange; then Robert Dundas, the younger

Judiciary 
 Lord President of the Court of Session – Lord Culloden
 Lord Justice General – Lord Ilay
 Lord Justice Clerk – Lord Milton

Events 
 February–November – Cambuslang Work, an outbreak of Christian revival at Cambuslang.
 16 February – the post of Secretary of State for Scotland, vacant since 1725, is revived in favour of John Hay, 4th Marquess of Tweeddale; he holds it until 1746.
 Delftware manufactured in Glasgow.
 Kirkcaldy Beer Duties Act passed.

Births 
 13 March (or 1743)? – Anne Hunter, née Home, lyricist (probably born in Ireland; died 1821 in London)
 28 April – Henry Dundas, statesman (died 1811)
 29 July – Isabella Graham, née Marshall, teacher and philanthropist (died 1814 in the United States)
 26 December (bapt.) – George Chalmers, antiquarian (died 1825 in London)
 John Kay, caricaturist and engraver (died 1826)

Deaths 
 2 April – James Douglas, royal physician, anatomist and obstetrician (born 1675; died in London)

See also 

 Timeline of Scottish history

References 

 
Years of the 18th century in Scotland
Scotland
1740s in Scotland